Julien Stassen (born 20 October 1988) is a Belgian former professional road bicycle racer, who rode professionally between 2012 and 2018 for the  and  teams.

Career
Born in Verviers, Stassen participated in several UCI World Tour events in 2017, including Gent–Wevelgem, Dwars door Vlaanderen, Omloop Het Nieuwsblad and E3 Harelbeke, but only finished Dwars door Vlaanderen, in 127th place.

Major results

2012
 4th Grand Prix Criquielion
 9th Beverbeek Classic
2013
 7th Schaal Sels
2014
 5th Overall Circuit des Ardennes
 6th Omloop van het Waasland
 7th Ronde Pévéloise
2016
 8th Flèche Ardennaise
 10th Paris–Troyes
2017
 7th Circuit de Wallonie

References

External links

1988 births
Living people
Belgian male cyclists
People from Verviers
Cyclists from Liège Province